Nikola Nikolov Stanchev (11 September 1930 – 12 July 2009) was a Bulgarian freestyle wrestler.

He was born in Tvarditsa, Burgas province.

Club: Chernomoretz Burgas

He was the 1956 Olympic Games middle weight freestyle wrestling champion - the first Bulgarian Olympics gold medal - and silver medal winner at the World championship in Istanbul the same year.

Notes

External links
profile

1930 births
2009 deaths
Olympic wrestlers of Bulgaria
Wrestlers at the 1956 Summer Olympics
Bulgarian male sport wrestlers
Olympic gold medalists for Bulgaria
Olympic medalists in wrestling
People from Burgas Province
Medalists at the 1956 Summer Olympics
20th-century Bulgarian people
21st-century Bulgarian people